Callulops stictogaster is a species of frog in the family Microhylidae. It is endemic to New Guinea and occurs in the central mountain ranges of Papua New Guinea in the Western Highlands, Eastern Highlands, Chimbu, and Morobe Provinces. The specific name stictogaster is derived from the Greek stictos (="spotted") and gaster (="belly"). Common name Irumbofoie callulops frog has been proposed for it.

Description
Callulops stictogaster is a relatively large species that can reach  in snout–vent length. There is a characteristic small ridge or tubercle between the eye and the nostril. The head is narrower than the body. The snout is bluntly rounded. The tympanum is visible but not prominent; the supratympanic fold is weak. The finger and the toe tips are rounded, lacking discs. The dorsal coloration varies from light purplish brown in preservative (holotype) to yellowish brown in life (a paratype). The ventral surfaces are brown with many tiny white spots.

Habitat and conservation
It appears to be terrestrial. Development is direct (i.e, there is no free-living larval stage). It is not a common species but can nevertheless occur in large numbers in suitable habitat. It is not exposed to significant threats, although it is used as pig feed in the Chimbu Province. It is not known to occur in protected areas.

References

stictogaster
Amphibians of New Guinea
Amphibians of Papua New Guinea
Endemic fauna of New Guinea
Endemic fauna of Papua New Guinea
Amphibians described in 1972
Taxa named by Richard G. Zweifel
Taxonomy articles created by Polbot